The Abattoir Blues Tour is the second live album by Nick Cave and the Bad Seeds, released on 29 January 2007. The deluxe release includes two audio CDs and two DVDs.

Track listing

CD 1
"O Children" - 6:59
"Hiding All Away" - 6:23
"Breathless" - 3:36
"Get Ready for Love" - 4:59
"Red Right Hand" - 5:24
"The Ship Song" - 4:09
"The Weeping Song" - 4:39
"Stagger Lee" - 8:44
(approx. total running time 44:50)

CD 2
"Carry Me" - 4:49
"Let the Bells Ring" - 4:55
"Easy Money" - 7:08
"Supernaturally" - 5:13
"Babe, You Turn Me On" - 5:08
"There She Goes, My Beautiful World" - 5:29
"God Is in the House" - 4:46
"Deanna" - 3:43
"Lay Me Low" - 5:49
(approx. total running time 46:56)

DVD 1
Brixton Academy, London - Thursday, 11 November 2004
"Hiding All Away"
"Messiah Ward"
"Easy Money"
"Supernaturally"
"The Lyre of Orpheus"
"Babe, You Turn Me On"
"Nature Boy"
"Get Ready for Love"
"Carry Me"
"There She Goes, My Beautiful World"
"God Is in the House"
"Red Right Hand"
"The Ship Song"
"Stagger Lee"

Personnel
 Nick Cave – vocals, piano
 Martyn P. Casey – bass
 Warren Ellis – violin, mandolin, bouzouki, flute
 Mick Harvey – guitars, bouzouki
 James Johnston - organ, guitar
 Conway Savage – piano
 Jim Sclavunos – drums and percussion
 Thomas Wydler – drums and percussion
 Geo Onaymake - vocals (Background)
 Eleanor Palmer - vocals (Background)
 Wendi Rose - vocals (Background)

DVD 2
Hammersmith Apollo, London - Saturday, 7 June 2003
"Wonderful Life"
"Nobody's Baby Now"
"Bring It On"
"Sad Waters"
"Watching Alice"
"Christina the Astonishing"
"Wild World"
Bonus Materials, Promotional Videos on DVD 2
"Bring it On"
"Babe, I'm on Fire"
"Nature Boy"
"Breathless"
"Get Ready for Love"
"Abattoir Blues/The Lyre of Orpheus", a short film

Personnel
 Nick Cave – vocals, piano
 Martyn P. Casey – bass
 Warren Ellis – violin, mandolin, bouzouki, flute
 Mick Harvey – guitars, bouzouki
 James Johnston organ, guitar
 Conway Savage – piano
 Jim Sclavunos – drums and percussion
 Thomas Wydler – drums and percussion
 Chris Bailey - guest vocals on "Bring it On"
 Blixa Bargeld - features in the "Bring it On" video, "Babe, I'm On Fire" video and the "Bring It On Shoot" feature on guitar
 Geo Onaymake - vocals (Background)
 Eleanor Palmer - vocals (Background)
 Wendi Rose - vocals (Background)

References

Nick Cave live albums
2007 video albums
Nick Cave video albums
Live video albums
2007 live albums